The Glass Sphinx is an Italian-American 1967 adventure film directed by Luigi Scattini.

Plot
An expedition led by a millionaire is going to Egypt to find the priceless Glass Sphinx buried in a tomb.  His assistant is an expert in Egyptian tombs.  They pick up an exotic beauty along the way, as well as a mysterious follower of the expedition.

Cast
Robert Taylor   as  Prof. Karl Nichols 
Anita Ekberg   as   Paulette 
Gianna Serra    as   Jenny 
Giacomo Rossi-Stuart    as    Ray (credited as Jack Stuart) 
Ángel del Pozo     as   Alex 
Remo De Angelis     as    Mirko 
José Truchado     as    Theo 
Emad Hamdy    as    Fouad 
Ahmed Kamis    as    Chief Shoukry 
Mohammed Tawfik  
Lidia Biondi

Notes
 Filmed in Egypt  
 Released in the United States in 1968.

See also
List of American films of 1967

References

External links
The Glass Sphinx

1967 adventure films
1967 films
Italian adventure films
American adventure films
Films set in Egypt
Films directed by Luigi Scattini
Treasure hunt films
Films scored by Roberto Pregadio
English-language Italian films
1960s English-language films
1960s American films
1960s Italian films